Grevillea eriostachya, also known as flame grevillea, orange grevillea, or honey grevillea, is a species of flowering plant in the family Proteaceae and is endemic to western parts of Australia. It is a shrub with a leafy base, mostly linear leaves and conical groups of bright yellow flowers on long canes above the foliage.

Description

Taxonomy
Grevillea eriostachya was first formally described in 1840 by John Lindley in A Sketch of the Vegetation of the Swan River Colony. The specific epithet (eriostachya) means "woolly flower-spike".

Distribution and habitat
Flame grevillea grows in heath or shrub on sandplains and is widespread in arid and semi-arid areas of Western Australia, the south-west of the Northern Territory and far north-western South Australia.

Ecology
Nectar-eating birds are attracted to the flowers.

Uses
Because of the sweet taste of the shrub's flowers, Aboriginal Australians used it as a sweetener and to add variety to their meals.

References

eriostachya
Eudicots of Western Australia
Flora of South Australia
Flora of the Northern Territory
Proteales of Australia
Taxa named by John Lindley
Plants described in 1840